Xystophora kostjuki is a moth of the family Gelechiidae. It was described by Oleksiy V. Bidzilya in 2000. It is found in the Tuva Republic of Russia.

References

Moths described in 2000
Xystophora